Daniel Francisco Monzon (May 17, 1946 – January 21, 1996) was an American professional baseball infielder, manager and scout. A third baseman, primarily in minor league baseball, he appeared in 94 games for the Minnesota Twins of Major League Baseball (MLB) in 1972 and 1973.

Playing career
Monzon was born in the Bronx, New York. He graduated from James Monroe High School in 1964 and attended Buena Vista College in Storm Lake, Iowa. He was drafted by the Minnesota Twins in the second round of the secondary phase of the 1967 MLB draft, and enjoyed his finest professional season that year with the Class A Short Season Auburn Twins, leading the New York–Penn League in runs scored, total bases, and triples, tying for the lead in RBIs, and finishing second in batting average (.338).

Monzon also enjoyed stellar seasons in the Double-A Southern League and Triple-A Pacific Coast League. His two seasons with the major league Twins saw him play a utility role, appearing at second and third base, shortstop, and in the outfield. He batted .244 with no home runs and nine RBIs in 131 at bats in 94 MLB games. He returned to the minor leagues in 1974, where he played through the 1977 season.

Post-playing career
Monzon's managing career began in 1978 in the New York Mets organization, where he directed teams at the Class A and Class A Short Season levels from 1978 to 1982. He then became a scout, based in Florida and covering Latin America for the Mets, Chicago Cubs, Milwaukee Brewers and Chicago White Sox. In 1995, he was named supervisor of Latin American scouting by the Boston Red Sox, but in his second year in that job, he was fatally injured in an automobile accident in Santo Domingo, Dominican Republic, at the age of 49.

References

External links

1946 births
1996 deaths
American sportspeople of Puerto Rican descent
Auburn Twins players
Baseball players from New York (state)
Boston Red Sox scouts
Buena Vista Beavers baseball players
Charleston Charlies players
Charlotte Hornets (baseball) players
Chicago Cubs scouts
Chicago White Sox scouts
Major League Baseball second basemen
Major League Baseball infielders
Memphis Blues players
Milwaukee Brewers scouts
Minnesota Twins players
Minor league baseball managers
New York Mets scouts
Portland Beavers players
Red Springs Twins players
Road incident deaths in the Dominican Republic
Wilson Tobs players
James Monroe High School (New York City) alumni